Count Manfred Beckett Czernin,  (18 January 1913 – 6 October 1962) was a Royal Air Force pilot and later an operative with the Special Operations Executive in the Second World War.

Early life

Czernin was born to the fourth son of Count Otto von Czernin, an Austrian diplomat, and his English wife, the Hon. Lucy Beckett, daughter of Ernest Beckett, 2nd Baron Grimthorpe. Several years after he was born, his parents were divorced. Young Manfred moved to Italy with his mother, but he was educated in the United Kingdom at Oundle School. In September 1931, he moved to Rhodesia to work on a tobacco plantation.

On 26 November 1931, he officially changed his name from Count Manfred Marie Edmund Ralph Czernin to Manfred Beckett. However, on 27 November 1936, he changed his name from Manfred Beckett to Count Manfred Beckett Czernin.

Royal Air Force

Czernin returned to the United Kingdom in April 1935 to take up an appointment as an acting pilot officer on a short service commission in the Royal Air Force (RAF). Qualifying as a pilot, he was posted to No. 57 Squadron RAF at RAF Upper Heyford, and he enjoyed several more squadron postings until placed on the Class A Reserve on 16 August 1937.

Recalled on the outbreak of hostilities, Czernin passed a fighter pilot assessment course and was posted to No. 504 Squadron at RAF Debden in January 1940. A few days later, he was transferred to No. 213 Squadron at RAF Wittering and in May to No.85 Squadron, flying Hurricanes.

Like others in the British Expeditionary Force, this unit had a hard time in fighting against the German Luftwaffe. On 16 May Czernin had to walk back to his squadron at Lille Airport after force-landing his aircraft, damaged by a Messerschmitt Bf 109 of 3/JG76. On 19 May he shot down a Heinkel He 111 and two Dornier Do 17, and a Henschel Hs 126 the next day, adding one more Heinkel 111 to his tally on 12 May before he returned again to England on 21 May by boat. Upon his return he was posted to No. 17 Squadron at RAF Martlesham Heath.

One of "The Few"

Still with No. 17 Squadron, Czernin fought with distinction throughout the Battle of Britain, tallying a Do 17 of II/KG2 on 12 July (shared), which crashed into the sea near a convoy off Orfordness. In the following month he shared a Ju 88 on 21 July and got three Bf 110s (including one shared) on 25 July. Later on, Czernin shot down two more Bf 110s on 3 September, a Bf 109 and two shared Heinkel 111s on 5 September, a Bf 110 on 11 September, a Ju 88 shared on 19 September and one more Bf 110 on 27 September and a Do 17 shared on 24 October.

Czernin himself was shot down on 17 November by German ace Adolf Galland in a combat over RAF Wattisham. Despite being wounded, Czernin managed to escape by parachute. His Hurricane crashed just west of Bradfield Church.

In May 1941 he was posted to an Operational Training Unit at RAF Debden and promoted to acting squadron leader in December. In February 1942 he was given command of No. 146 Squadron RAF, in India, and later on was posted to HQ No. 224 Group as a Staff Officer. He returned to the United Kingdom to take up a similar posting at HQ No. 28 Group, RAF Uxbridge, until he was recruited by Special Operations Executive (SOE) under the cover of another similar assignment.

Special Operations in Italy

Czernin was parachuted into northern Italy, not far from the Austrian border, on the night of 13 June 1944, winning in the process a Military Cross for his decision to go ahead with the jump in spite of dubious signalling from the "welcome party" on the ground: it was not infrequent for the Germans to try to intercept Allied airdrops to get hold of both of men and supplies directed to the Italian Resistance. A fluent speaker of Italian, Czernin operated from a farmhouse in the Tramonti area near Pordenone, and he set up a very effective Partisan network before being picked up by a Lysander special operations aircraft and flown back to Bari at the end of the year.

His second mission took place in March 1945 when he parachuted in Lombardy, taking command of the operations that led to the surrender of Bergamo.

Post-war

Discharged from the RAF as a squadron leader in October 1945, he became sales manager for Fiat in England. He died suddenly on 6 October 1962.

Awards

The citation for Czernin's Distinguished Flying Cross cited his "great keenness in his desire to engage the enemy" and specifically mentioned that in August 1940, "he led his section in a head-on attack on large formations of enemy aircraft, destroying three of them."

His citation for the Military Cross reads:

The Distinguished Service Order (DSO) was awarded for activities behind the enemy lines in March to April 1945. Directed to "co-ordinate the various scattered Partisan units into a unified command", which was to "carry out the directions of 15 Army Group" he was parachuted in. To reach the Bergamasco area he had to cross the  Passo del Diavolo which was six feet deep in snow. On the move for 24 hours in the cold, he suffered frostbite but crossed it on 4 April – his third attempt. Throughout his "energy and personality" he "quickly built up a large aggressive Partisan Command". The Partisans then began operations on 28 April 1945. Three enemy garrisons surrendered unconditionally, another three were captured or "eliminated". This was followed by the surrender of Bergamo.

Czernin and the leader of the Partisans initially demanded unconditional surrender of the Germans. Boldly driving into the city in a car "draped with the Union Jack", they had to withdraw after the Germans fired upon them. He ordered an attack on the city simultaneously with the underground elements within Bergamo. In the morning of 28 April 1945, Czernin obtained the unconditional surrender. The DSO citation said that he "displayed the highest qualities of leadership and by his courage and daring made a notable contribution to the Allied success in North Italy."

See also

Czernin von und zu Chudenitz
Rovetta massacre

References

Bibliography

External links

 

1913 births
1962 deaths
Recipients of the Distinguished Flying Cross (United Kingdom)
Recipients of the Military Cross
Companions of the Distinguished Service Order
Royal Air Force squadron leaders
Royal Air Force pilots of World War II
Shot-down aviators
British World War II flying aces
British Special Operations Executive personnel
Manfred
People educated at Oundle School
The Few
Austrian emigrants to Italy
Italian emigrants to the United Kingdom
People from Berlin
People from the Kingdom of Prussia